Shi or SHI may refer to:

Language 
 Shi, a Japanese title commonly used as a pronoun
 Shi, proposed gender-neutral pronoun
 Shi (kana), a kana in Japanese syllabaries
 Shi language
 Shī, transliteration of Chinese Radical 44
 Tachelhit or the Shilha language (ISO 639 code)

Art 
 Shi, a piece in Chinese chess
 Shi (comics), a comic book series created by William Tucci
 Shi (poetry), the Chinese conception of poetry
 Poetry (film) or Shi, a 2010 South Korean film directed by Lee Chang-dong

People 
 Shi (class), the low aristocratic class of Shang/Zhou China, later the scholar-gentry class of imperial China
 Shi (rank), rank group for non-commissioned officers
 Shi (personator), a ceremonial "corpse" involved in early forms of ancestor worship in China

Names 

 Shì (氏), a Chinese clan name previously distinguished from ancestral or family names; see Origin of Chinese surnames
 Shī (surname), the romanization of the Chinese surname 施
 Shí (surname), the romanization of the Chinese surname 石
 Shǐ (surname), the romanization of the Chinese surname 史
 Shì (surname), the romanization of the Chinese surname 士
Shí (surname 時), the romanization of the Chinese surname 時
 Shi (Korean given name), Korean given name
 Posthumous name (諡), a traditional East Asian honorary name

Acronym 
 Samsung Heavy Industries, a Korean shipbuilding and offshore EPC company
 Sumitomo Heavy Industries, a Japanese integrated manufacturer of industrial machinery, automatic weaponry, ships, bridges and steel structure, equipment for environmental protection company
 Statutory health insurance, or national health insurance
 Stolen Horse International, a non-profit organization founded to assist horse owners with recovering horses lost during theft

Mathematics 
 Shi, hyperbolic sine integral

Units 
 Shí or shichen, a traditional Chinese unit of time equal to two hours
 Shì (市), various administrative divisions generally translated "city" in mainland China, on Taiwan, and in Japan

Other 
 Shchi or "schi", a classic traditional Russian soup
 SHI International Corp, an American information technology company
 Shi Islet (獅嶼), Lieyu Township, Kinmen County, Fujian, Republic of China (Taiwan)
 SHI, the Chapman code for Shetland, UK
 SHI, the IATA code for Shimojishima Airport in the  Okinawa Prefecture, Japan
 SHI, the National Rail code for Shiplake railway station in the county of Oxfordshire, UK

See also 
 Shíshī, stone Chinese guardian lions
 "Shī Shì shí shī shǐ", the "Lion-Eating Poet in the Stone Den", a tongue twister
 Xi (disambiguation)
 Shishi (disambiguation)
 She (disambiguation)